Hanna-Oyen was a provincial electoral district in Alberta mandated to return a single member to the Legislative Assembly of Alberta from 1971 to 1979.

The electoral district took its name from the Town of Hanna, Alberta and the Village of Oyen, Alberta.

Members of the Legislative Assembly (MLAs)

Election results

1971 general election

1975 general election

See also
List of Alberta provincial electoral districts
Hanna, Alberta, a town in Alberta
Oyen, Alberta, a village in Alberta

References

Further reading

External links
Elections Alberta
The Legislative Assembly of Alberta

Former provincial electoral districts of Alberta